MAPFRE is a Volvo Ocean 65 yacht. She finished fourth in the 2014–15 Volvo Ocean Race skippered by Iker Martínez and by Xabi Fernández in the 2017–18 Volvo Ocean Race.

The chief executive officer of the team is Pedro Campos Calvo-Sotelo and Neal McDonald is the Sports and Performance Director.

2017-2018 Volvo Ocean Race

2014-15 crew

 Iker Martínez, skipper
 Xabi Fernández, watch captain, stand-in skipper legs 3, 4, 8
 Jean-Luc Nélias, navigator
 André Fonseca “Bochecha”, watch captain
 Antonio Cuervas-Mons, bowman
 Rob Greenhalgh, watch captain
 Carlos Hernández, trimmer/helmsman 
 "Rafa" Rafael Trujillo Villar, trimmer/helmsman
 Willy Altadill, trimmer
 "Willy" Guillermo Altadill Fisher, trimmer
 Francisco Vignale, onboard reporter
 Anthony Marchand, trimmer/helmsman
 Sam Goodchild, trimmer/helmsman
 Nico Lunven, navigator, leg 1
 Michel Desjoyeaux, watch captain, leg 1

References

Volvo Ocean Race yachts
Volvo Ocean 65 yachts
Sailing yachts of Spain
2010s sailing yachts
Sailing yachts designed by Farr Yacht Design
Volvo Ocean Race teams